Roy and HG are an Australian comedy duo, comprising Greig Pickhaver in the role of "H. G. Nelson" and John Doyle as "'Rampaging' Roy Slaven". Their act is an affectionate but irreverent parody of Australia's obsession with sport. Their characters are based on stereotypes in sports journalism: Nelson the excitable announcer, and Slaven the retired sportsman turned expert commentator. In his 1996 book Petrol, Bait, Ammo & Ice, Pickhaver summarised the duo's comedic style as "making the serious trivial and the trivial serious".

The duo's long-running triple j radio program This Sporting Life was added to the National Film and Sound Archive's Sounds of Australia registry in 2013, and the This Sporting Life 30th anniversary retrospective collection won the ARIA Award for Best Comedy Release in 2016.

Since March 2020, Roy and HG's weekly show Bludging on the Blindside airs on Saturday afternoons on ABC Sport, ABC Local Radio, and the ABC Listen app, as well as podcast platforms.

It was reported in July 2021 that Roy & HG would host Dodging Armageddon, a daily podcast for ABC Radio with an Olympics theme, which will air throughout the XXXII Olympiad's competitions.

Radio

triple j 
Doyle and Pickhaver wrote and hosted the live, improvised, and satirical radio program This Sporting Life on triple J from 1986 to 2008. They also broadcast annual live commentaries of the NRL and AFL Grand Finals (dubbed the Festival of the Boot, Parts I and II) and the Melbourne Cup. Commentaries for all three matches of rugby league's annual State of Origin series are also broadcast (main article: Roy and HG's State of Origin commentary), and they have also broadcast live commentaries of other major events, including the Bicentennial celebrations on 26 January 1988 and the 2007 Australian federal election (Indecision 07). They also provided a half-hour coverage of the 2008 Beijing Olympics every weekday under the guise of the Golden Ring Show.

At conclusion, 'This Sporting Life' held the record as the longest-running program in the history of triple j.

Triple M 
Starting 12 January 2009, the duo presented the drive-time program The Life on the Triple M network, on Mondays and Fridays. In 2011, 'The Life' show was cut to Fridays only, with the last episode broadcast on 25 November 2011. 'Roy & HG's Mardi Gras of Medals' – their coverage of the Rio Olympic Games – was broadcast on Triple M in August 2016.

A weekly program, 'The Sporting Probe with Roy & HG' commenced broadcast in January 2017 and ran for two years until December 2018. The show aired from 10:00 am to midday on Saturday in 2017, and in the same timeslot on Sunday in 2018. All episodes are available as a podcast.

Macquarie Sports Radio 

In 2019, Roy and HG presented Just Short of a Length on the Macquarie Sports Radio network. Nine Radio have not renewed programming contacts for 2020 and beyond with Roy and HG after dropping the unpopular MSR branded talk format and returning to a music format for their Sydney 2UE, Melbourne 3EE aka Magic 1278, and Brisbane 4BH assets. All three stations reverting to their original historical station ID call signs.

ABC Radio 
Between 2012-16, Roy and HG resumed their Festival Of The Boot AFL and NRL grand final commentaries on ABC NewsRadio.

In March 2020, Roy and HG returned to ABC Sport to present a new weekly Saturday afternoon show entitled Bludging on the Blindside. The show is broadcast on ABC Sport digital radio and the ABC Listen app, and broadcast on ABC Local Radio in NSW, ACT and QLD. All episodes are available on podcast platforms soon after initial broadcast.

In July 2021, it was announced that Roy & HG will be presenting a daily Olympic games podcast for ABC Radio, entitled 'Dodging Armageddon'.

Television

ABC 
After several years on radio, Roy and HG transferred the radio show's format to a series of ABC television shows, including Blah Blah Blah (1988) (where they were only seen in silhouette), This Sporting Life (1993–94), the Logie award-winning Club Buggery (1995–97) and its successor The Channel Nine Show (1998), Planet Norwich (1998; made in the UK) and The Memphis Trousers Half Hour (2005; taped in Sydney but performed as if broadcast from the United States).

UK 
In 1997, the duo featured in an ad campaign for Foster's Lager in the United Kingdom, featuring the recurring tagline, "Tickle it, you wrigglers!". Their British profile increased, they subsequently appeared as recurring guests on the 1998 BBC one series, "The Ben Elton Show" a stand up / variety show fronted by Elton, but also featuring the return of Ronnie Corbett's 'armchair monologue' in a regular slot, and a different musical guest each week.

Seven Network 
After transferring to the commercial Seven Network in the late 1990s, they presented Win Roy & H.G.'s Money (2000), an unsuccessful adaptation of the US hit Win Ben Stein's Money. They later succeeded with higher-rating shows The Monday Dump and The Nation Dumps.

Their biggest hit was their top-rating commentary-interview television program The Dream with Roy and HG (from the Sydney 2000 Olympics), featuring their own special outlook on the event. The Dream was followed by three spinoffs – The Ice Dream (from the 2002 Salt Lake City Winter Olympics), The Cream (from the 2003 Rugby World Cup), and more recently The Dream again for the Athens 2004 Olympics. During the Ice Dream they launched a bid for the Winter Olympics to be held at Smiggin Holes, in the humorous Smiggin Holes 2010 Winter Olympic bid with suggested slogans "Unleash the Mighty Mongrel", "Winter Wonder Down Under" and "If you've got the poles, we've got the holes." Dream-style coverage of the 2006 FIFA World Cup, called the Dribble mit HG und Roy, was streamed via the Internet.

Roy and H.G.'s sport shows were filmed in front of a live studio audience, segments including discussion between the two characters, interview with athletic guests and pre-recorded sports commentary. The humour of the duo's sports commentary came from their mock-serious tone which belied the innuendo and invented terminology that they used to describe the on-screen action. The pair would state fictitious "facts" about the competitors' occupations, histories and personalities. Roy & H.G. would also describe fictitious aspects of the competition venues, such as the so-called "Gobbler's Gulch" section of the Salt Lake City luge track.

Roy and HG were not selected by Channel Seven to cover the Beijing Olympics because of security concerns and the belief by Channel Seven management that the style of their coverage – going to air live following a day's events – would not have suited Australian audiences given Australia's time zones. Instead, a daily radio programme, The Golden Ring Show, was broadcast on triple j, with Roy styled as "Crouching Tiger" and H.G. as "the Hidden Dragon".

The Memphis Trousers Half Hour 

In 2005, they presented The Memphis Trousers Half Hour, a TV show they claimed was recorded in different American cities such as Baltimore or Albuquerque, ensuring that 'Australia is the flavour of the month, every month'. The show screened weekly on the ABC on Saturday nights and was named after an incident in which former Australian prime minister Malcolm Fraser lost his trousers in a Memphis hotel.

The show, seemingly filmed in the United States, was in fact filmed entirely in Sydney. The format was a parody of American talk shows and pretended to present Americans with new 'facts' about Australia.

Network Ten 
Roy and HG joined Network Ten for their Sochi 2014 Winter Olympics coverage, where they hosted a commentary show called Roy and HG's Russian Revolution. HG Nelson also joined Stephen Quartermain and Alisa Camplin for the Sochi Tonight daily show.

Awards and nominations

Published works 
1989: Pants Off: This Sporting Life, by Roy Slaven and H.G. Nelson (book)
1996: Petrol, Bait, Ammo & Ice by H.G. Nelson, with a foreword by Roy Slaven; illustrated by Reg Mombassa (book)
2000: The Dream with Roy and HG: The Sydney 2000 Olympic Games, (DVD)

Albums

Influence on artists in other media 
In 2001 a portrait of Roy & HG by visual artist Paul Newton won the Packing Room Prize and the People's Choice award at the Archibald Prize.

References

External links
Roy and HG's webpage at Triple M
Dribble mit HG und Roy
Call of the Wild – 2006 article discussing Roy and HG's 20 years on Triple J: their influences, style and enduring popularity

Triple M presenters
Triple J announcers
Australian comedy duos
Australian radio comedy
Australian comedy troupes
ARIA Award winners